Lava Kusa is a 2015 Telugu language film directed by Jaya Sreesivan. It stars Varun Sandesh and Richa Panai.

Cast

Varun Sandesh...Prem Kumar/ Kushal Kumar
Richa Panai... Subba Lakshmi
Ruchi Tripati...Satya
Brahmanandam
Babu Mohan
Prabhakar
V Satyamohan Reddy
S.Prakash

Soundtrack
The music is composed by Ram Narayan.

Reception

123telugu gave 2.25 out of 5 stars criticizing the screenplay of the film which made it below par.

References

External links 
 

2010s Telugu-language films